Five Points is an unincorporated community in Le Sauk Township, Stearns County, Minnesota, United States. It is located at the junction of Stearns County Roads 4 and 133, 6th Street South.

References

Unincorporated communities in Stearns County, Minnesota
Unincorporated communities in Minnesota